Essa Mohammed Gharib Al-Zankawi (born 17 October 1992) is a Kuwaiti/Hungarian athlete in Kuwait’s national Athletics team specializing in Discus throw. He competed at the 2015 World Championships in Beijing without qualifying for the final. He won a silver medal at the 2015 Asian Championships and a bronze at the 2018 Asian Games, where he served as the flag bearer for Kuwait at the opening ceremony.

Competition record

References

Living people
Place of birth missing (living people)
1992 births
Kuwaiti male athletes
Male discus throwers
Kuwaiti discus throwers
World Athletics Championships athletes for Kuwait
Athletes (track and field) at the 2010 Asian Games
Athletes (track and field) at the 2014 Asian Games
Athletes (track and field) at the 2018 Asian Games
Medalists at the 2018 Asian Games
Asian Games medalists in athletics (track and field)
Asian Games bronze medalists for Kuwait
Islamic Solidarity Games competitors for Kuwait